Balwant (Bal) Singh Saini is a former British hockey international of Indian descent. He made his debut for England on 12 March 1977 when he played against West Germany at Lords, London. He scored a spectacular goal on his debut at Lords which is still remembered. He went on to win 18 England caps and represented British field hockey team in 4th World Cup in Buenos Aires in 1978.

Bal also won his first England Indoor cap on 10 January 1981. He went on to win 18 Indoor caps, scoring 11 goals.

On the domestic circuit, he was also a member of Slough's successful teams in the late 70s and early 80s.

References 

Living people
British male field hockey players
Punjabi people
Year of birth missing (living people)